In Greek mythology, Phene is the name of a legendary queen of Attica, and the wife of Periphas. They were a just and fair royal couple who were transformed into birds by Zeus.

Etymology 
The ancient Greek noun  means vulture, at least a kind of vulture. According to Celoria, the elements pha- and phe- in the names of Periphas and Phene can both be traced to the ancient Greek verb  (phaino), meaning 'to appear'. According to Beekes it has no clear etymology, and its alternative spelling  (phínis), points to a pre-Greek origin, which according to him is the most likely possibility anyway.

Mythology 
Phene was married to Periphas, a king of Attica. Periphas was a pious and just man, beloved by his subjects, who then began to worship him as a god. They erected temples to him and worshipped him using Zeus's cult titles such as Soter (the saviour) and Epopsios ("overlooker of all"). This angered Zeus, who planned on striking Periphas with one of his thunderbolts. But Apollo intervened and convinced his father to spare Periphas because he (Apollo) had been greatly honoured by the king. So he then came to Phene and Periphas's house, and found them conversing together. He turned Periphas into an eagle immediately. Phene, not wanting to be separated from her husband, asked to be changed into a bird as well. Her wish was fulfilled and she was transformed into a phene, a kind of vulture (perhaps lammergeier). By decree of Zeus, that vulture became a good omen for mankind.

Antoninus Liberalis, who recorded the tale, did not mention Phene's name, only the bird she transformed into, and simply referred to her as Periphas's wife. Her name comes from an earlier Roman writer, Ovid, who only mentions her in passing along with Periphas. Ovid calls her 'most just Phene'.

See also 

 Orpheus
 Dido
 Laodamia of Phylace

References

Bibliography 
 Antoninus Liberalis, The Metamorphoses of Antoninus Liberalis translated by Francis Celoria (Routledge 1992). Online version at the Topos Text Project.
 
 
  Online version at Perseus.tufts project.
 
 

Queens in Greek mythology
Attican characters in Greek mythology
Deeds of Zeus
Deeds of Apollo
Metamorphoses characters
Metamorphoses into birds in Greek mythology